Nathan Coenen (born 10 September 1992) is an Australian actor.

He is most well known for his work in The Sleepover Club 2, a TV series aired across Australia and Europe, as well as the short feature Tinglewood, which blitzed the festival season with success.

He was nominated for a Young Artists Award in the Best Performance for a Leading Actor in a Short Film, based on his work in Tinglewood.

He attended the John Curtin College of the Arts until 2009. He enrolled at Guildhall School of Music & Drama in 2012, graduating in 2015.

References

 https://web.archive.org/web/20111004193520/http://www.mcomet.com/celebrity/Nathan_Coenen-48095

External links
 

Australian male television actors
Australian male child actors
Male actors from Adelaide
1992 births
Living people
Male actors from Los Angeles